"A Bitter Lullaby" is a song performed by Swedish singer Martin Almgren. Almgren participated with the song in Melodifestivalen 2018 where it made it to the final from the third semi-final, finishing eighth.

Charts

References

2018 singles
English-language Swedish songs
Melodifestivalen songs of 2018
Swedish pop songs